The Disciplina Tour is the ongoing fifth concert tour by Argentine singer Lali. The tour saw multiple songs performed for the first time live, including those from her fourth studio album, Libra (2020) and songs belonging to her yet-to-be-announced forthcoming fifth studio album such as "Disciplina", "Diva" and "N5". It began on 23 June 2022 and it has already travelled across Latin America, Europe and Asia.

In March 2023, Lali became the first Argentine woman to ever sold out the fifty-thousand-seat José Amalfitani Stadium with the Disciplina Tour. The show was broadcast live on the TV special Disciplina Tour Live from Buenos Aires on Star+ and Disney+.

Background
The Disciplina Tour marks Lali's comeback to performing live after closing her Brava Tour in Washington, D.C. back in November 2019. In 2020, Lali released her fourth studio album, Libra. Although intentions for touring were expressed, a proper tour could not be planned due to COVID-19 restrictions. On early 2022, after over a year without releasing new music, Lali released three singles consecutively: "Disciplina", "Diva" and "Como Tú", and confirmed that she would tour sometime that year, adding to an increasing anticipation for her new tour. On 4 April 2022, Lali finally announced the first date of the Disciplina Tour, which would take place on 23 June 2022 at the Luna Park Arena in Buenos Aires. The show sold out in less than three hours, forcing a new date to be added for the following day. When that show also sold out within hours, Lali announced a new date in the city, though this time the show would take place in a bigger venue, the Buenos Aires's Movistar Arena, which also sold out immediately. On 22 May 2022, the singer announced the first Argentine dates for the tour, which included stops in Mendoza, Mar del Plata, La Plata, Córdoba, and Rosario, among others.

Critical reception

Argentina
From the beginning, the tour has received favorable reviews from the critic. In a positive review for Clarín, Marcelo Fernández Bitar described Lali as "a complete and talented show-woman, a hurricane capable of delivering a show of international nature, similar to those by Britney [Spears] or Madonna." Another positive opinion came from Juana Giaimo of Rolling Stone, who mentioned that during the show's development, "[Lali's] professionalism was clear in every step she took and it was clear in her voice that she has talent but also the ability to keep on singing with the same energy even while she danced." Martín Pérez of Diario Show highlighted Lali's maturity on stage and the repertoire selection as well as the choreographies and the live band. Similar thoughts were published by Mercedes Paz of Filo News, who pointed out that the most mesmerizing aspect of the concert were the choreographies, the multiple costume changes, the new versions of her songs, and the staging. Rocío Pascual of Red Boing gave out a similar response, saying that the show had been "a combination of millimetrically planned elements that gave life to something that up until then had not existed in Argentina." Similarly, Sofía Olivera of Gente ended her review saying that "once again, Lali showed that the charismatic and brave girl [...] is one of the biggest stars of new pop in Argentina."

Diario Uno's Gabriel Soto wrote a review on the show in Mendoza and praised the show and its scenography and dancers, but admitted that it was not enough as regards vocals. On the other hand, Antonella Ramírez of Los Andes named Lali the "queen of Argentine pop" and highlighted the performances of "Ego" and "No Estoy Sola", referring to them as two of the most emotional moments of the night. Moreover, it was written in Mar del Plata's newspaper La Capital the show as "powerful and avant-garde." Reviewing the show for Aire Digital, Florencia Rosa defined the concert of Santa Fe as "a show of international quality, with musicians of excellence and dancers that showed talent in every genre" and said that Lali "did not stop smiling to the concert goers." Juan Manuel Pairone from Córdoba's newspaper La Voz del Interior described the concert as "an astonishing visual setting [with] multiple costume and setting changes" and complemented the review singling out "Disciplina" as "the most electronic part of the show", comparing the performance to those by Beyoncé or Lady Gaga. Daniela Barreiro of El Ciudadano reviewed the show of Rosario and remarked the concert and Lali's interaction with the attendants. She also praised the visibility and support from Lali to the trans-non-binary collective from Santa Fe. Nicolás Sánchez Picón also wrote a review for La Gaceta and praised the show and its set list, especially during "Diva", affirming that "what Lali does reminds [people] of the greatest pop icons."

Latin America
Belén Fourment of Uruguayan newspaper El País reviewd the show of Montevideo. She described Lali as "a pop monster of extraordinary dimensions" and commented that "being the best pop artist of the region has its cost and [Lali] pays it with an absolute delivery that displays her as an indisputable international figure." On her review for Soho Kulture, Carolina Rodríguez highlighted the show's production, choreographies and outfit changes, and held that "Lali has a small phyiscal complexion, but on stage she is a giant."

Following the show in Santiago, Scarleth Nuñez of Agenda Pop praised Vesta Lugg's opening act and stated that "Lali shows that she can sing as good as she sings," although she singled out that "the only problem with the show is the space between songs, in which she simply disappears and nothing happens on stage."

Europe and Asia
In his review of the Madrid concert, Mario Caridad Sánchez of Los 40 described it as "an authentic electro-pop party that exceeded every expectation" and said that "from the very first moments, [her fans] showed devotion and emotion that would follow the singer throughout the rest of the night."  Borja Arana of La Casa de Música wrote that the "Disciplina Tour invites you to total devotion; it is pure energy". He added that "the sensuality of the music on this show is one of its greatest pillars; it does not seek sexualization but energy."

As for the first Tel Aviv concert, Nofar Rotem of the Israeli website Frogi wrote that "Lali delivered an inverted and energetic performance."

Set list
This set list is representative of the show on 23 June 2022 in Buenos Aires. It is not representative of all concerts for the duration of the tour.

"Eclipse"
"Asesina"
"Tu Novia"
"Fascinada"
"Somos Amantes"
"Bailo Pa Mi"
"Diva"
"Histeria" 
"Irresistible"
"Soy" 
"Ego"
"Lo Que Tengo Yo"
"Ladrón"
"Como Así"
"Una Na"
"No Puedo Olvidarte"

"Sin Querer Queriendo"
"Caliente" 
"2 Son 3"
"Del Otro Lado" 
"No Estoy Sola"
"Enredaos"
"Disciplina"
"Mil Años Luz"
"100 Grados"
"Unico"
"A Bailar"
"N5"
"Como Tú"
"Reina"
"Laligera"
"Boomerang"

Shows

Cancelled shows

Live broadcast
Disciplina Tour Live from Buenos Aires is a concert film that was broadcast live exclusively on Star+ and Disney+ on March 4, 2023. The film follows Argentine singer Lali's performance at José Amalfitani Stadium in Buenos Aires, Argentina on her record-breaking headlining concert tour, the Disciplina Tour.

Performances
Twenty-nine songs were performed in the following order in the broadcast:

 "Eclipse"
 "Asesina"
 "Tu Novia"
 "2 Son 3"
 "Diva"
 "Histeria" 
 "Irresistible" 
 "Soy" 
 "Yo Te Diré" 
 "Ego"
 "Cómprame un Brishito"
 "Una Na"
 "Fascinada"
 "Somos Amantes"
 "Cómo Dormiste?" 
 "Sin Querer Queriendo"
 "Caliente" 
 "Del Otro Lado" 
 "No Estoy Sola"
 "Amor Es Presente" / "El Amor Después del Amor"
 "Disciplina"
 "Motiveishon" 
 "Mil Años Luz"
 "100 Grados"
 "A Bailar"
 "Como Tú" 
 "N5"
 "Laligera"
 "Boomerang"

Notes
Notes for rescheduled shows

Notes for festival appearances

References

Lali Espósito concert tours
2022 concert tours
Concert tours of South America